Rick Shlosser is a graduate of the Berklee College of Music. He has been a member of Van Morrison's band and The Nitty Gritty Dirt Band. He's also been a varied sessions drummer.

Discography

1970s
 Andy Pratt - Records Are Like Life (1969)
 Lamb - Bring Out the Sun (1971)
 Cris Williamson - Cris Williamson (1971)
 Ronnie Hawkins - The Hawk - Collection (1971)
 Van Morrison - Tupelo Honey (1971)
 Link Wray - Be What You Want To (1972)
 Eric Andersen - Blue River (1972)
 Pamela Polland - Pamela Polland (1972)
 Van Morrison - Saint Dominic's Preview (1972)
 Andy Pratt - Andy Pratt (1973)
 Van Morrison - Hard Nose the Highway (1973)
 Link Wray - The Link Wray Rumble (1974)
 Art Garfunkel - Breakaway (1975)
 The Manhattan Transfer - Coming Out (1976)
 Leo Sayer - Endless Flight (1976)
 Rod Stewart - A Night on the Town (1976)
 Bob Crewe - Street Talk (1976)
 Diana Ross - Baby It's Me (1977)
 David Castle - Castle in the Sky (1977)
 Rory Block - Intoxication So Bitter Sweet (1977)
 Leif Garrett - Leif Garrett (1977)
 Burton Cummings - My Own Way to Rock (1977)
 Andy Pratt - Shiver in the Night (1977)
 Topaz - Topaz (1977)
 Art Garfunkel - Watermark (1977)
 The Bellamy Brothers - Beautiful Friends (1978)
 Stephen Bishop - Bish (1978)
 King of Hearts - Close But No Guitar (1978)
 Etta James - Deep in the Night (1978)
 Burton Cummings - Dream of a Child (1978)
 Steve Harley - Hobo with a Grin (1978)
 Dusty Springfield - It Begins Again (1978)
 Nicolette Larson - Nicolette (1978)
 Ronnie Montrose - Open Fire (1978)
 The Hues Corporation - Your Place or Mine (1978)
 Dream Babies - Bombs Away (1979)
 Michael Christian - Boy from New York City (1979)
 Tom Johnston - Everything You've Heard Is True (1979)
 Ronnie Hawkins - Hawk (1979)
 Leo Sayer - Here (1979)
 Nicolette Larson - In the Nick of Time - (1979)
 Bill Quateman - Just Like You (1979)
 Lauren Wood - Lauren Wood (1979)
 Maria Muldaur - Open Your Eyes (1979)
 Gilberto Gil - Realce (1979)
 Adam Mitchell - Redhead in Trouble (1979)
 Adrian Gurvitz - Sweet Vendetta (1979)
 Juice Newton - Take Heart (1979)
 Barbra Streisand - Wet (1979)
 Alessi Brothers - Words & Music (1979)

1980s
 The Nitty Gritty Dirt Band - Make a Little Magic (1980)
 Livingston Taylor - Man's Best Friend (1980)
 John Cougar - Nothin' Matters and What If It Did (1980)
 Steve Cropper - Playin' My Thang (1980)
 Nicolette Larson - Radioland (1980)
 Raymond Louis Kennedy - Ray Kennedy (1980)
 Eric Carmen - Tonight You're Mine (1980)
 Burton Cummings - Woman Love (1980)
 Various Artists - Endless Love (soundtrack) (1980)
 Dolly Parton -  9 to 5 and Odd Jobs  (1980)
 Little Feat - Hoy-Hoy! (1981)
 The Nitty Gritty Dirt Band - Jealousy (1981)
 Juice Newton - Juice (1981)
 Lee Ritenour - Rit (1981)
 Art Garfunkel - Scissors Cut (1981)
 Tanya Tucker - Should I Do It (1981)
 Billy Preston - The Way I Am (1981)
 Nicolette Larson - All Dressed Up and No Place to Go (1982)
 Jack Mack and the Heartattack - Cardiac Party (1982)
 Linda Ronstadt - Get Closer (1982)
 Maynard Ferguson - Hollywood (1982)
 Cher - I Paralyze (1982)
 Stanley Clarke - Let Me Know You (1982)
 The Nitty Gritty Dirt Band - Let's Go (1982)
 John Fischer - Dark Horse (1982)
 Lionel Richie - Lionel Richie (1982)
 Juice Newton - Quiet Lies (1982)
 Patrick Simmons - Arcade (1983)
 Juice Newton - Dirty Looks (1983)
 Janis Ian - Uncle Wonderful (1983)
 George Benson - 20/20 (1984)
 Barry Manilow - Manilow  (1985)
 James Taylor - That's Why I'm Here (1985)
 Juice Newton - Old Flame (1986)

1990s
 Joe Esposito - Treated & Released (1996)
 Jan Berry - Second Wave (1997)
 Marty Joe Kupersmith - It'll Come to You (1997)
 David Frankel Band - Deep Blue Goodbye (1998)
 Juice Newton - American Girl (1999)

2000s
 Scott Ellison -  Steamin (2000)
 Juice Newton - Every Road Leads Back to You (2002)
 Andy Pratt - Heaven and Earth (2003)
 Andy Pratt - New Resolutions (2004)
 Jennifer Getz - Makin' History (2004)
 DePresleys - Leaking Blue (2009)

2010s
 DePresleys - Cosmic People (2012)
 DePresleys - Topanga (2012)
 DePresleys - Cobb Mountain Live (2014)

References

External links
 Rick Shlosser website

Year of birth missing (living people)
Living people
Van Morrison
Berklee College of Music alumni
Place of birth missing (living people)
American rock drummers
American session musicians